Bolsover (and commonly ) is a constituency in Derbyshire, represented in the House of Commons of the UK Parliament by Mark Fletcher, a member of the Conservative Party. The constituency was created in 1950, and is centred on the town of Bolsover.

Between 1970 and 2019, the constituency was represented by Labour's Dennis Skinner, who by 2019 was the oldest member of the House of Commons and the second longest-serving. At the constituency's inception it was one of the safest Labour seats in the country, but over the following half century Skinner's vote share dropped from 77% in 1970, still holding a high vote share of 65% in 2005, to only 36% in 2019, with the result that he lost the seat to the Conservatives by a margin of 11%.

History
Before the Reform Act 1832, relatively wealthy people (forty-shilling freeholders) of the whole county could attend elections when there was an opposition candidate. From 1868 until 1885 the area formed part of the East Derbyshire constituency, redrawn out of the North Derbyshire constituency formed in 1832. The Bolsover constituency was created in 1950 from parts of the constituencies of North East Derbyshire, formed in 1885, and Clay Cross, formed in 1918.

Boundaries

1950–1983: The Urban District of Bolsover, and the Rural Districts of Blackwell and Clowne.

1983–2010: The District of Bolsover, and the District of North East Derbyshire wards of Morton, Pilsley, Shirland, and Sutton.

2010–present: The District of Bolsover, and the District of North East Derbyshire wards of Holmewood and Heath, Pilsley and Morton, Shirland, and Sutton.

Constituency profile
The seat includes many former mining communities. Before 2019 it was a Labour Party stronghold, although the then MP Dennis Skinner's share of the popular vote dropped to 50% in the 2010 election from a high of 77.5% (see below), amongst social and boundary changes. Its economy faced struggles after the last closures in the early 1990s of the coal pits upon which the area thrived for many years. Bolsover's tourism industry has emerged in recent years, including accommodation and tours involving Bolsover Castle, owned by English Heritage, and Hardwick Hall, home of Bess of Hardwick.

Skinner, who held the seat from 1970 until 2019, was between 2017 and 2019 the second longest serving MP in the Commons after Kenneth Clarke. In the 2010 general election, Skinner received exactly 50% of the vote - 21,994 of the 43,988 votes cast. At the 2017 general election, Skinner's majority was cut to little more than 5,000, the first time the Labour majority in the seat had ever been lower than 10,000. He lost his bid to be re-elected in 2019 losing to Conservative candidate Mark Fletcher.

The majority of voters in the area voted in favour of Brexit during the 2016 referendum; this was the preferred outcome of the then local MP Dennis Skinner. This considerable turn out in favour of Brexit resulted in Reform UK to include it in its priority list of constituencies for the next General Election.

Members of Parliament

Elections

Elections in the 2020s

Elections in the 2010s

Elections in the 2000s

Elections in the 1990s

Elections in the 1980s

Elections in the 1970s

Elections in the 1960s

Elections in the 1950s

See also
 List of parliamentary constituencies in Derbyshire

References

External links 
nomis Constituency Profile for Bolsover — presenting data from the ONS annual population survey and other official statistics.

Parliamentary constituencies in Derbyshire
Constituencies of the Parliament of the United Kingdom established in 1950
Bolsover District